Telvum Thangzalam Haokip (T.T. Haokip) is an Indian politician and a former member of the Bharatiya Janata Party. Haokip was elected as a member of the Manipur Legislative Assembly from the Henglep constituency in Churachandpur District as a Bharatiya Janata Party candidate in 2017. He was the Chairman of the Hill Areas Committee (HAC) from 2017 to 2020. He was the former Deputy Speaker of the 6th Manipur Legislative Assembly. He joined the Indian National Congress in June, 2020.

History
 Elected MLA from Henglep constituency, 6th Manipur Legislative Assembly 1998, and Deputy Speaker Manipur Legislative Assembly.
 Elected MLA from Henglep constituency, 11th Manipur Legislative Assembly 2017.
 Chairman, Hill Areas Committee (HAC)

References

Manipur MLAs 2017–2022
Manipur politicians
Year of birth missing (living people)
Living people
Bharatiya Janata Party politicians from Manipur
Indian National Congress politicians from Manipur
People from Churachandpur district